Hohenfelde may refer to the following places in Germany:

in Schleswig-Holstein:
Hohenfelde, Steinburg, in the district of Steinburg
Hohenfelde, Plön, in the district of Plön
Hohenfelde, Stormarn, in the district of Stormarn 
Hohenfelde, Mecklenburg-Vorpommern, in the district of Bad Doberan, Mecklenburg-Vorpommern 
Hohenfelde, Hamburg, a quarter in Hamburg